Erwin Noack (born 4 August 1940 in Uetersen, Hamburg - died 11 November 2006 in Bremen) was a German artist and musician. He was known for his murals of various buildings in Bremen and as the percussionist of Thirsty Moon, a German progressive-rock-jazz band.

External links
Erwin Noack homepage
Art in public space Bremen

Thirsty Moon

1940 births
2006 deaths
German percussionists
German artists
20th-century German musicians